Ashmont station (signed as Ashmont/Peabody Sq.) is a Massachusetts Bay Transportation Authority (MBTA) intermodal transit station located at Peabody Square in the Dorchester neighborhood of Boston, Massachusetts. It is the southern terminus of the Ashmont branch of the rapid transit Red Line, the northern terminus of the connecting light rail Ashmont–Mattapan High-Speed Line, and a major terminal for MBTA bus service. Ashmont has two side platforms serving the below-grade Red Line and a single side platform on an elevated balloon loop for the Mattapan Line. The station is fully accessible for all modes.

History

The first Ashmont station was a simple building along the original Shawmut Branch of the Old Colony Railroad, which opened in 1872. Service on the branch ended in 1926 as the Boston Elevated Railway constructed its Dorchester Extension. Ashmont and  stations opened on September 1, 1928, with Ashmont the terminal station. Like , Ashmont was designed for convenient transfer between rapid transit trains and surface streetcars. It had two island platforms with rapid transit on the inner tracks and streetcars on the outer tracks, allowing cross-platform transfers in both directions. Several streetcar lines were replaced with buses shortly after the station opened, using a surface-level busway on the west side of the station.

The Eastern Mass eventually operated three bus routes out of Ashmont, all of which became MBTA bus routes in 1971: to Brockton (now route ), to Quincy via Granite Avenue, and to Quincy via Adams Street. The remaining surface streetcar lines running to Ashmont were gradually replaced by buses, with the final two routes (now routes  and ) replaced by trolleybuses in 1949. The grade-separated Mattapan Line continued streetcar operation. From 1948 to 1968, Hudson Bus Lines operated service from Ashmont to several South Shore locations.

The station was modernized in 1976. The station was made nominally accessible, though the 1990 passage of the Americans with Disabilities Act created stricter standards. In 1981, the platforms were extended for six-car trains, which were introduced in 1988.

Reconstruction

The MBTA issued a $4.3 million design contract for renovations of Ashmont, Shawmut, and Fields Corner stations on May 3, 2001; the Ashmont portion was $1.3 million. The agency issued a request for proposals for transit-oriented development on an adjacent MBTA-owned  parcel on January 22, 2002, and began negotiations with a developer that June. The developer signed an 85-year lease and paid $1.4 million up front to the MBTA. The Ashmont station renovation was originally to be smaller in scope than the major projects planned at the other Ashmont branch stations. The developer and the local community expressed their desires for a larger renovation, but the MBTA proceeded with design work. 

On January 10, 2003, with design work at 90% and $2.2 million spent, the MBTA stopped work. A $3.3 million design for a full reconstruction was authorized on February 12, 2004. The Shawmut and Fields Corner projects were constructed separate from the delayed Ashmont work. The MBTA removed the membrane canopy from the design in September 2004 due to lack of funds. However, it was necessary to re-add (at a cost of $2.9 million) because many of the interior elements were not weatherproofed. Original plans to include public art as part of the Arts on the Line program were removed in budget cuts; only historical interpretive panels were installed.

In September 2004, the MBTA began reconstruction of the 75-year-old station, then expected to cost $44 million. The MBTA awarded the $35.2 million main construction contract on June 9 2005. The reconstruction included demolition of the existing station, the addition of two fare lobbies over the ends of the station, and a new busway at the fare lobby level. Elevators were added to make station fully accessible, and direct access from Peabody Square (removed in the 1970s renovation) was added. The Ashmont–Mattapan line loop was moved to a new viaduct at the south end of the station, with a platform near the south fare lobby; the former cross-platform transfer was eliminated.

Red Line service to Ashmont was maintained through the whole construction process. However, the Ashmont–Mattapan line was closed from June 24, 2006 to December 22, 2007 for construction of the new viaduct. During that time, Mattapan station and the intermediate stations were also renovated for accessibility. The main reconstruction contract was completed in 2009 at a cost of $53.2 million - an increase of $18 million over the original price due to change orders. The $10.3 million architectural work lasted until June 14, 2011, at which point the station was declared accessible. In September 2011, a "HOLD" sign was installed on the trolley platform to allow an easier connection for those transferring from the Red Line. The total cost of the entire reconstruction was $83 million.

Bus connections

Ashmont is a major terminal for the MBTA bus system, with nine local routes serving the station busway:
: Ashmont station–
: Ashmont station–
: Ashmont station– via Talbot Ave
: Ashmont station–Ruggles station via Washington Street
: Ashmont station-Norfolk Street Loop
: –Ashmont station
: Mattapan station–
: –Ashmont station via West Quincy
: Quincy Center station–Ashmont station via Wollaston station
: Avon Square–Ashmont station

The Brockton Area Transit Authority operates its route 12 to Ashmont – one of the only non-MBTA routes running to an MBTA rapid transit station. It was part of route 240 until 1971.

References

External links

MBTA – Ashmont
 Station from Google Maps Street View

Dorchester, Boston
Red Line (MBTA) stations
Railway stations in Boston
Railway stations in the United States opened in 1928
Stations along Old Colony Railroad lines